Brandywine Productions is an American film production company known for its Alien film series, founded in 1969 by American filmmakers Walter Hill, David Giler, and Gordon Carroll.

Films

Notes and references

External links 
 Official website

American companies established in 1969
Film production companies of the United States